Charlotte Miller (born 24 November 1970) is a British rower. She competed in the women's eight event at the 2000 Summer Olympics.

References

External links
 

1970 births
Living people
British female rowers
Olympic rowers of Great Britain
Rowers at the 2000 Summer Olympics
Sportspeople from York